El Saddik is a surname. Notable people with the surname include:

 Abdulmotaleb El Saddik (born 1969), Lebanese-Canadian computer engineer and scientist
 Wafaa El Saddik (born 1950), Egyptian egyptologist